Shangri-Las-65! is the second album by the Shangri-Las. Released in late 1965, it serves as the follow-up album to Leader of the Pack, which was released earlier in the year.

The original pressing of the album contains the hits singles "Out in the Streets" and "Give Us Your Blessings". The second pressing includes the hit "I Can Never Go Home Anymore", and excludes the album track "The Dum Dum Ditty". The second pressing was later repackaged and re-released as I Can Never Go Home Anymore.

Track listing 
Side one

Side two (first pressing)

Side two (second pressing and I Can Never Go Home Anymore)

Personnel 
Shangri-Las

 Mary Weiss – lead and backing vocals
 Betty Weiss – lead and backing vocals
 Mary Ann Ganser – lead and backing vocals
 Marguerite Ganser – backing vocals

Technical

George "Shadow" Morton – producer

Jeff Barry – producer

Robert Bateman – producer

Robert Moseley – producer

Artie Butler – arranger

Charts 

Albums

Singles

Red Bird Records albums
The Shangri-Las albums
1965 albums